This article presents the discography of all albums and singles released by American girl group Exposé. It includes three studio albums, five compilation albums, one video album, 11 music videos, and 17 singles including the group's number one single on the Billboard Hot 100, "Seasons Change".

Albums

Studio albums

Compilation albums

Singles

Videography

Video albums

Music videos

Notes

References

Discographies of American artists
Pop music group discographies